Enterpia is a genus of moths of the family Noctuidae.

Species
 Enterpia alpherakyi Hacker, 1996
 Enterpia laudeti (Boisduval, 1840)
 Enterpia picturata (Alphéraky, 1882)
 Enterpia roseocandida Hacker, 1996

References
Natural History Museum Lepidoptera genus database
Enterpia at funet

Hadenini